The Gift is a 2015 psychological thriller film written, co-produced, and directed by Joel Edgerton in his feature directorial debut, and co-produced by Jason Blum and Rebecca Yeldham. The film stars Jason Bateman and Rebecca Hall as Simon and Robyn Callem, a couple intimidated by a figure from Simon's past played by Edgerton.

It was released in the United States on August 7, 2015, as the first film released by STX Entertainment. The film grossed $60 million worldwide on a budget of $5 million and received positive reviews from critics, who praised Edgerton's direction and screenplay, as well as Bateman, Hall and Edgerton's performances.

Plot

A married couple, Simon and Robyn Callem, relocate from Chicago to a Los Angeles suburb after Simon takes a new job. They run into Gordon "Gordo" Moseley, Simon's old high school classmate. Gordo begins repeatedly dropping in unannounced and delivering gifts, such as bottles of wine and koi for their pond. His presence makes Simon uncomfortable, but Robyn sees no problem.

Gordo invites them and another couple to his large home, but, when the Callems arrive, he tells them the other couple cancelled. He exits abruptly to deal with a work problem, leaving them alone and making Simon suspicious. When Gordo returns, Simon tells Gordo to stay away from them.

The next day, Robyn finds the koi dead and their dog missing. When Simon drives to Gordo's house to confront him, he discovers the home actually belongs to another couple. In the days following, Robyn begins to suspect that she is not alone in the house, finding faucets on and hearing footsteps. Unable to sleep, she steals prescription pills.

That night, the dog suddenly returns, and Robyn finds a letter of apology from Gordo in the mail. The message ends with a note to Simon that says Gordo was "willing to let bygones be bygones" with regard to an event from years prior, but not anymore. Simon claims he does not know what it refers to.

Simon asks his boss about a promotion and is told that his only competition is his coworker Danny McDonald. Robyn's increasing paranoia while home alone causes her to faint. She wakes up in bed the next morning and finds Simon with her stolen pills, revealing that this was a problem for her in Chicago.

Time passes, things improve, and Robyn becomes pregnant. One day however, she sees Gordo watching her while shopping. Simon's sister tells her that in high school, Simon and his friend Greg reported that Gordo had been molested by an older boy, which led to Gordo getting bullied and transferring schools. Robyn discovers that Simon has run background checks on Danny McDonald and Gordo, who has spent his life in and out of prison. She seeks out Greg, who reveals the molestation story was fabricated by Simon, calling him a bully. As a result of the false report, Gordo's father thought Gordo was gay and tried to burn him alive, leading to his arrest for attempted murder and Gordo being sent to military school. When Robyn asks why Simon would have done such a thing, Greg replies, "because he could." He goes on to explain that Simon was a bully with a "real mean streak." 

Robyn confronts Simon but he denies responsibility. At her behest, he tracks down Gordo and delivers a non-apology. Gordo knows Simon is insincere and warns Simon that the past is not done with him yet. Furious, Simon attacks Gordo. He later lies to Robyn, saying Gordo accepted his apology.

Simon is promoted, but at his celebration party, Danny McDonald hurls rocks at his house and accuses Simon of fabricating information and ruining his career in order to get the promotion. Robyn goes into labor and gives birth to a boy. Simon is fired for lying about McDonald, and Robyn tells him that she wants to separate.

Simon returns home to find another gift box, consisting of a key to their house, an audio recording of Simon and Robyn making fun of Gordo, and footage shot from inside their home that shows Gordo standing over Robyn when she had fainted, seemingly about to sexually assault her. Gordo wears the mask of a monkey (a lifelong fear for Simon) as he touches an unconscious Robyn on the bed before the camera cuts.

At the same time, Gordo visits Robyn at the hospital with a bandaged eye and his arm in a sling. He tells her that Simon caused his injuries. Simon rushes to the hospital but misses Gordo, who smirks at him as the elevator doors close. Gordo calls Simon to taunt him, refusing to confirm whether or not he raped Robyn and fathered the baby, just as Simon refused to come clean about the molestation story years before. With his marriage over and his career destroyed, Simon breaks down as Gordo watches. Satisfied with his revenge, Gordo walks away, tossing away the sling from his arm.

Cast

Joel Edgerton's brother, Nash Edgerton, plays the part of Frank Dale, in addition to his duties as the film's stunt coordinator.

Production
The project was announced in August 2012, with Joel Edgerton writing the screenplay and Edgerton set to make his directing debut. His inspirations for the screenplay included Alfred Hitchcock, Fatal Attraction and Michael Haneke's 2005 French film Caché, as well as Park Chan-wook's Vengeance Trilogy.

Principal photography began on January 19, 2015, and ended on February 20, 2015. A majority of filming took place at a home in the Hollywood Hills neighborhood, where STX Entertainment also held promotional interviews for the film. The film was shot on an Arri Alexa with Canon K35 lenses, and was filmed in 25 days, according to its cinematographer, Eduard Grau. Grau was recommended by Nash Edgerton, who served as the film's stunt coordinator, after the two were part of the production for the 2013 short film Streetcar. In an interview with Collider, Edgerton revealed that he did not start filming his acting role until two weeks into shooting (devoting that time, instead, solely to directing). As soon as he did, his older brother Nash assisted on set behind the camera. Edgerton completed shooting his role as Gordo in seven days.

Post-production took eleven weeks from March to June 2015. Luke Doolan also edited Sundance winner Animal Kingdom (also starring Edgerton). On January 20, 2015, STX Entertainment bought the United States distribution rights to the film. STX retitled the film The Gift.

Release
STX initially set The Gift for domestic release on July 31, 2015, and later moved it to August 7, 2015. The first trailer was released on April 1, 2015. It premiered on Twitter's live video streaming app Periscope, making STX Entertainment the first advertiser to work with Twitter on a campaign incorporating Periscope.

Reception

Box office
The Gift grossed $43.8 million in North America and $15.2 million in other territories for a worldwide total of $59 million, against a budget of $5 million.

In its opening weekend, the film grossed $11.9 million, finishing third at the box office behind Mission: Impossible – Rogue Nation ($28.5 million) and fellow newcomer Fantastic Four ($25.7 million).

Critical response
On review aggregator website Rotten Tomatoes, the film has a rating of 91%, based on 194 reviews, with an average rating of 7.50/10. The site's critical consensus reads, "The Gift is wickedly smart and playfully subversive, challenging the audience's expectations while leaving them leaning on the edges of their seats." Metacritic gives the film a score of 77 out of 100, based on 31 critics, indicating "generally favorable reviews". On CinemaScore, audiences gave the film an average grade of "B" on an A+ to F scale.

Time Outs Daisy Bowie-Sell praised The Gift as "darkly unnerving", commending its ending and comparing it positively to a similar film, The Hand That Rocks the Cradle. In a review for IndieWire, Katie Walsh lamented the film's use of common thriller cliches and restraint towards the climax, but lauded Joel Edgerton's direction, concluding: "His deft, controlled maneuvering of plot, character, style, and tone is damn near perfect for his feature debut—even if it is in service of a very standard genre piece."

Critics also praised Bateman, known for portraying the “straight man” in comedies, for playing against type as the mean-spirited Simon. RogerEbert.com’s Sheila O’Malley wrote that Bateman gives a “beautiful and focused performance” as someone who is “kindly and condescending, sometimes in the same moment”. Colliders Matt Goldberg commented that, while the film “almost goes too far in making [Simon] a sociopath”, Bateman's charisma worked for the character: “What makes Bateman inherently likable gives Simon a lot of his power, and it’s a memorable performance as we despise the character but also wonder if he deserves vicious comeuppance for what he did to Gordo.” Slates Keith Phipps wrote that “Bateman plays Simon with the easy charm and everyman approachability of past roles,” but “pushes the charm into smarm and the approachability into sleaze.”

Accolades

References

External links
 
 
 
 
 

2015 films
2015 directorial debut films
2015 independent films
2015 psychological thriller films
2015 thriller drama films
2010s American films
2010s English-language films
2010s mystery drama films
2010s mystery thriller films
2010s psychological drama films
American films about revenge
American independent films
American mystery drama films
American mystery thriller films
American psychological drama films
American psychological thriller films
American thriller drama films
Australian films about revenge
Australian independent films
Australian mystery thriller films
Australian thriller drama films
Blumhouse Productions films
Films about bullying
Films about stalking
Films directed by Joel Edgerton
Films produced by Jason Blum
Films produced by Joel Edgerton
Films set in Los Angeles
Films shot in Los Angeles
Films with screenplays by Joel Edgerton
STX Entertainment films